James Julian Bennett Jack  (born 25 March 1936) is a New Zealand physiologist.

Education
Jack graduated from the University of Otago with a PhD in 1960. After his PhD, Jack was awarded a Rhodes Scholarship in 1960 from Magdalen College, Oxford where he was awarded Master of Arts and Bachelor of Medicine degrees in 1963.

Career and research
Jack studies how nerve cells, or neurons, communicate with one another in the nervous system. He is also interested in understanding how chemical and electrical signals move through neural networks, such as the spinal cord or cerebral cortex. Although neurons form large networks, these cells do not actually touch each other. Instead, when the end of a nerve is activated it releases ions or chemicals known as neurotransmitters. Subsequently, these move across the gap, or synapse, between the neuron and the adjacent cell in the network, activating its receptors and perpetuating the signal. Jack applies theoretical and experimental approaches to research this process of synaptic transmission. This includes the use of neurophysiology methods to record bioelectrical activity and mathematical models to analyse the central and peripheral nervous systems. His work on neurotransmission is offering insight into disorders of the nervous system, such as Alzheimer’s disease and multiple sclerosis, and has the potential to improve their diagnosis.

Jack was Lecturer and Reader at University Laboratory of Physiology at the University of Oxford. His former doctoral students include Michael Hausser and Dimitri Kullmann.

Awards and honours
Jack was elected a Fellow of the Royal Society (FRS) in 1997.

References

New Zealand physiologists
1936 births
Fellows of the Royal Society
New Zealand Fellows of the Royal Society
Living people
University of Otago alumni
People from Invercargill
New Zealand Rhodes Scholars
Alumni of Magdalen College, Oxford
Fellows of University College, Oxford